Moawhango Névé is a small névé between Mount Camelot and Monte Cassino, in the Freyberg Mountains of Antarctica. It was named by the New Zealand Geological Survey Antarctic Expedition of 1967–68 in association with a locality of the same name in New Zealand.

References

Mountain passes of Victoria Land
Snow fields of the Ross Dependency
Pennell Coast
Névés of Antarctica